Porbandar State was a princely state during the British Raj ruled by Jethwa dynasty. It was one of the few princely states with a coastline.

The capital of state was the harbour town of Porbandar. Some other important towns of this state were Bhanvad, Chhaya, Ranpar, and Shrinagar. Earlier Shrinagar served as the capital of Jethwas, then Ghumli served as the capital, but was lost to the Jadejas, however, architectural heritage built by them still stands at Ghumli. It enjoyed a revenue of Rs. 21,00,000/-.

History
In 1193 Porbandar State was founded by an ancestral ruler expelled from Morvi State. 
In 1307 the state was renamed 'Ranpur' and in 1574 it was renamed 'Chhaya'. Finally in 1785 the state reverted to the name Porbandar. 
On 5 December 1809 it became a British protectorate and between 1886 and 15 September 1900 the state was administered by the Bombay Presidency. It was part of the Kathiawar Agency from 1819 to 1922.

In 1888, during the reign of Vikramatji Khimojiraj, the State started metre-gauge railway called Porbandar State Railway, which after independence was merged in to Saurashtra Railway.

Upon the Independence of India in 1947, the state acceded unto the dominion of India. It was merged with the 'United State of Kathiawar', effective from 15 February 1948 and eventually came to form part of the present-day state of Gujarat.

The grandfather of Mahatma Gandhi, the leader of Indian independence movement, Uttamchand Gandhi and later his father – Karamchand Gandhi and uncle – Tulsidas Gandhi, served as Dewan to Rana of Porbandar state.

Rulers
Porbandar State was ruled by the Jethwa dynasty of Rajputs. By 1947, the rulers held the style of "Highness" and the title of "Maharaj Rana Sahib"; they were entitled to a salute of 13 guns as a hereditary distinction.

Ranas

1699 – 1709 Bhanji Sartanji (d. 1709)
1709 – 1728 Khimoji III (d. 1728) 
1728 – 1757 Vikmatji III Khimoji (d. 1757)  
1757 – 22 April 1813 Sartanji II Vikmatji (d. 1813) 
1804 – 1812 Haloji Sultanji -Regent (d. 1812) 
22 Apr 1813 – 20 June 1831 Khimojiraj Haloji (d. 1831)
20 Jun 1831 – 21 April 1900 Vikramatji Khimojiraj (b. 1819 – d. 1900) 
20 Jun 1831 – 1841 Rani Rupaliba Kunverba (f) -Regent (d. 1841)
21 Apr 1900 – 10 December 1908 Bhavsinhji Madhavsinhji (b. 1867 – d. 1908) 
10 Dec 1908 –  1 January 1918 Natwarsinhji Bhavsinhji (b. 1901 – d. 1979) 
10 Dec 1908 – 1909 Regents
                           – J.K. Condon (to 1909)
                          – Rao Bahadur A.S. Tambe (1909–1910)
                           – Wala Vajsur Valera (1909–1913) (b. 1873 – d. 19..)    
                           – F. de B. Hancock (1913–1916) (d. 1916)
                           – Edward O'Brien (Apr 1916 – 1918) (b. 1872 – d. 1965)

Maharaja Rana Sahib Shri
 
 1 January 1918 – 15 August 1947 Natwarsinhji Bhavsinhji (s.a.) (from 3 June 1929, Sir Natwarsinhji Bhavsinhji)
 1 January 1918 – 26 January 1920 Edward O'Brien -Regent (s.a.)

Administrators

1886 – 1890 Frederick Styles Philpin Lely (b. 1846 – d. 1934)
1890 – 1894 Shankar Pandurang Pandit
Mar 1894 – 1896 William Thomson Morison
Nov 1897 – 1900 Francis William Snell

Symbols

Flag 
The flag is an elongated triangle in light orange with a purple variegated edge; near the pole, a red triangle with a double triangular red flag on its shaft, a long inscription in red.

Coat of Arms 
The coat of arms features Hanuman. The crest is a bull, and supporters are two bisons. The motto was "Sri Vusubh dwujay  numah" (I bow to the flag, whose sign is the bull)

See also
Bhavsinhji Madhavsinhji
Natwarsinhji Bhavsinhji
Udaybhansinhji Natwarsinhji Jethwa

References

External links

States and territories established in 1193
States and territories disestablished in 1948
Kathiawar Agency
Porbandar district
Princely states of Gujarat
Former countries in South Asia
Former protectorates
Former monarchies of South Asia
Rajputs
1193 establishments in Asia
1948 disestablishments in India
12th-century establishments in India